Atelier Fauni was a Finnish arts and crafts studio, operating from 1952–1971 in Finland.

From Naantali, and later in Tusby and Träskända, the company made soft toys, mainly in the form of handmade trolls made from leather, fabric and skin.

The studio was best known for their Moomin figurines, which were produced from 1955 and are now collectors' items. The studio initially did not have a license to produce Moomin merchandise, but Tove Jansson liked the dolls, and between 1955 and 1971 they had Jansson's permission to create the Moomin figurines. Moomin merchandise has become popular collectors items, and Atelier Fauni's production belongs to the more valuable toys. The individually most popular figure, however, was the Sumpit troll, which also inspired a band, which went by the name of the troll. Their creations also inspired a theme park, Peikkometsä, in Järvenpää. 

The atelier name comes from the Roman forest god, Faunus.

Atelier Fauni was re-established in the U.S. in the 1970s by Kuuskoski and her children under the name Troll Store. Helena Kuuskoski died in Wilmington, North Carolina on September 1, 2013.

References

External Links

The story of Atelier Fauni and their Moomin troll dolls – moomin.com
Pictures of moomin (mumin) dolls from Atelier Fauni
Troll Forest

Defunct manufacturing companies of Finland
Toy companies
Crafts
Tove Jansson
Moomins
Manufacturing companies disestablished in 1971
Toy companies established in 1952
Naantali